The killing caves of Phnom Sampeau are a Khmer Rouge execution site on Phnom Sampeau, a hill  southwest of Battambang in western Cambodia. The Khmer Rouge killed their victims on top of the cave at the rim of a daylight shaft or ceiling hole and then threw the dead body into the cave. Men and women were placed in separate caves and clothes in another. There are a number of caves at Phnom Sampeau (Sampeau Hill) that have traditionally served as Buddhist temples. Today there is a large glass memorial in the cave next to the skulls and bones and a golden reclining Buddha, that can be reached via a staircase. A memorial, assembled from cyclone fencing and chicken wire contains human bones at the base of the stairway.

Geography

The killing caves are located on the Mountain of Phnom Sampeau, about mid-way up the mountain along a  well-made diversion road. The mountain is of karstic limestone and has a group of temples located on it.
The mountain is also home for a group of macaques, which feed on bananas left by pilgrims in front of the shrines. There is a natural arch made of stalactites from where there are scenic views of the deep canyon, and the valley also has vegetation of vines and inhabited by bats.

Features
 
The caves, which are approached through a series of steps flanked by green vegetation, have a golden, reclining Buddha image.  Skulls and bones are kept in a glass-covered cabinet next to the Buddha statue. These were the people who were killed by the Khmer Rouge Regime; their bodies were thrown through a natural chute from above, a skylight opening. Remnants of war artillery (of the government forces) are seen there, oriented towards Phnom Krapau (Crocodile Mountain), which was the strategic location of the Khmer Rouge during the war. At the base point from where the steps lead to the cave, there is an old memorial, a chicken-wire enclosure which also houses skulls and bones of those killed by the Khmer Rouge. Another feature seen is an incomplete Buddha carving, a  image, carved partly into the rock face of the hill, with only the head of the Buddha exposed. Lack of funds was the reason for its incompleteness.

References

External Links

Cambodian genocide
Caves of Cambodia
Geography of Battambang province
Khmer Rouge
Monuments and memorials in Cambodia